= Ms&t =

MS&T may refer to:

- MS&T (magazine), an international defence simulation and training publication
- Missouri University of Science and Technology
