= MS&T (magazine) =

British military magazine

- Editor: Chris Lehman
- Categories: Military Training
- Frequency: Bi-monthly
- Publisher: Andrew Smith
- Founded: 1984
- Company: Halldale Media Ltd
- Country: United Kingdom
- Language: British English
- Website: www.halldale.com/mst
- ISSN: 1471-1052

MS&T (Military Simulation & Training) is an international defence simulation and training publication produced bi-monthly in the UK by Halldale Media.

== History and profile ==
MS&T was first published in 1984, and has provided continuous, international coverage ever since with its world-wide team of journalists. The magazine is published six times per year.

Halldale Media also publish MS&T's sister publication Civil Aviation Training Magazine (CAT).

== Content ==
Each issue of the magazine contains a broad geographical spread of features. A typical issue would include a national focus, instructional design insights, in-service reports, technology updates, defence training policies as well as extended news and analysis, event reviews and an industry calendar. Issue 4 each year differs from the regular format by incorporating additional content including an Industry Trends article (a round-up of military training activity over the past 12 months) and the Military Flight Simulator Census (a comprehensive census of flight simulators in use world-wide).
